Les Clips Vol. III is a VHS recorded by the French singer Mylène Farmer, containing all the singer's videoclips from 1989 to 1990. It was released in March 1990 in France.

In order to release a new video clips, Laurent Boutonnat decided to include the two live videos "Allan" and "Plus grandir", and had therefore deleted them from the video En Concert, which was scheduled to release a few weeks later. Despite its platinum certification, this VHS was the least-selling video, in comparison with the two previous VHS.

This VHS content is also included on the DVD Music Videos I.

Formats

This video is available only on VHS.

Track listings

Credits and personnel

 Directed by Laurent Boutonnat 
 Produced by Toutankhamon
 Editions : Polydor / Bertrand Le Page
Except : "À quoi je sers...": Requiem Publishing / Bertrand Le Page

Certifications and sales

References

Mylène Farmer video albums
1990 video albums